Summit Hills, Summit Hill or Summithill may refer to:

Places
In the United States
Summit Hills (New Mexico), a range in New Mexico
Summithill, Ohio, an unincorporated community
Summit Hill, Pennsylvania, a borough

Elsewhere
Summit Hills, Nigeria, a real estate development in Nigeria